The Moro Gulf is the largest gulf in the Philippines. It is located off the coast of Mindanao Island, and is part of the Celebes Sea. The gulf is one of the country's tuna fishing grounds.

Geography
The gulf stretches between and is surrounded by the main section of Mindanao on the east, and the Zamboanga Peninsula of Mindanao on the west. The peninsula's major drainage goes towards the gulf.

Sibuguey Bay and Illana Bay are its major bays.

Zamboanga City, which is an international port, is bound by the Gulf and Celebes Sea in the East. Cotabato City, on the eastern coast, is another major port.

Earthquakes
The Moro Gulf is also an area of significant tectonic activity with several fault zones in the region capable of producing major earthquakes and destructive local tsunamis, such as the devastating 1976 Moro Gulf earthquake which killed over 5,000 people and left over 90,000 people homeless as it hit the west coast of Mindanao.

See also
 Celebes Sea
 List of earthquakes in the Philippines
 Port of Zamboanga

References

Moro
Bodies of water of the Celebes Sea
Landforms of Sultan Kudarat
Landforms of Lanao del Sur
Landforms of Lanao del Norte
Landforms of Zamboanga del Sur
Landforms of Zamboanga Sibugay
Landforms of Maguindanao del Norte